Prince Hours (lit. "Palace S") is a 2007 South Korean romantic comedy television series, starring Seven, Huh E-jae, Kang Doo and Park Shin-hye. It is a spin-off of the 2006 series Goong (also known as Princess Hours), both were directed by Hwang In-roi and produced by Group Eight. Goong S aired on MBC from January 10 to March 15, 2007 on Wednesdays and Thursdays at 21:55 for 20 episodes.

Plot
 
The story set in a universe where Korea is a constitutional monarchy. The Empress regnant, (Myung Se-bin), already in her thirties, is still unmarried and without an heir, which prompts the imperial court to look for a suitable Crown Prince. They encounter Lee Hoo (Seven), the son of the empress' cousin, and brings him into the palace where he begins to learn the life of a royal. However, another competitor arrives at the court: Lee Joon (Kang Doo), the son of another cousin of the Empress. They compete for the title of Crown Prince via a trial of several tasks to determine the worthy future Emperor of the country.

Cast and characters
Seven as Kang Hoo/Lee Hoo
A prince raised as a commoner because his mother was thrown out of the palace shortly before his birth. After his mother's death, he was raised by one of the former Palace guards. The imperial family was unaware of his existence until he was  taken into the succession line by the Empress. At the beginning, Lee Hoo seemed to be the least likely candidate to fill the spot of Crown Prince. He was rash, lacked focus and was seemingly selfish to most but as he struggled to learn of the life he was destined to live, he turned into a considerate, mature and responsible young man. He is also fair and has a great sense of right and wrong.

Heo Yi-jae as Yang Soon-ae
Prince Lee Hoo's childhood friend and one of the few that still refer him as Kang Hoo (the name he was raised as). A sensible and kind-hearted young woman who works as a palace maid. She is in love with Lee Hoo, and is supportive of Lee Hoo during his journey to becoming a Crown Prince.

Kang Doo as Lee Joon
Raised by nobility, Prince Lee Joon has his mind set to be the next Emperor of Korea. He was to be engaged to the Prime Minister's daughter Shin Sae-ryung and agreed to the arrangement, but later resented it as he fell for palace maid Yang Soon-ae. He later refused the throne after realizing the truth of his father's greed, and decided to pursue his dreams of becoming a musician.

Park Shin-hye as Shin Sae-ryung
The daughter of the Prime Minister, who was raised to be a proper lady and groomed to be the next Empress of Korea. She had always followed her father's instructions after her mom left her for a life of simplicity. Though her only interest was to be the Empress, she eventually fell for Prince Lee Hoo. She eventually came to peace with her mother's decision, and remain friends with both Princes.

Myung Se-bin as Queen Hwa-in
Korea's current reigning Empress. In public, she seems to be the most well-adjusted woman with high regards, but in truth, she has been concealing her feelings. She had been in love with a half-Korean, half-Austrian professor whom she met during her studies at Oxford University, but had to leave him and return to Korea to assume her role. She becomes conflicted when her former love, Alexander comes to Korea, when she is forced once again to choose between her love or people.

Marc Andre Jourdan as Alexander
The Empress's love interest. He's half-Korean, half-Austrian, and though unable to speak fluent Korean, he is able to understand the language. He came to Korea, accepting a job offer at the Royal Academy and at the same time seeking for an answer for the choices the Empress had made. He later backed out, realizing that it would make the situation difficult for the Empress. He left Korea and later it was revealed that he also contributed to Yang Soon-ae's education fund.

Oh Mi-hee as Empress Dowager
The mother of the current Empress, who is rather detached from the outside world from having lived in the palace for a very long time. She is unable to distinguish the difference between the latest technology. She is very fond of Prince Lee Hoo. Though she supported Prince Lee Hoo's father when he chose to marry a commoner, she strongly opposed his Lee Hoo's relationship with Yang Soon-ae, for fear of history repeating itself.

Supporting cast
Ha Jae-young as Grand Duke Hyo-sung 
Chun Ho-jin as Grand Prince (Hyojang Daegong) Lee Gyeom, Joon's father
Yoon Ye-hee as Jang Yoon-hee, Joon's mother
Cha Hyun-jung as Min Shi-yeon, Joon's bodyguard
Lee Hong-pyo as Min Young-hyun
Jeon Hye-soo as Shi Jong-gwan
Seo Song-hee as Ma Young-nam, Soon-ae's friend
Seo Young-don as In-woo
So Do-bi as Min-hyuk
Lee Man-young as Kwak Nae-kwan
Song Baek-kyung as Bulbam
Ye Soo-jung as Court attendant Han
Lee Ki-young as Go Sang-ki
Lee Joo-hyun as Yoon-chul
Lee Ho-jae as Jin Sin-sa
Kim Hong-sik as Shin Jae-man, Sae-ryung's father
Jeon Soo-hyun as court attendant Choi
Kim Chang-sung as Jjooba
Jung Hye-young as Hoo's mother (cameo)
Cho Sung-hwan as Jjodaeng
Hwang In-woo as Hwang Ka
Moon Ga-young

Reception
Although Princess Hours was a hit, Prince Hours failed to attract many viewers. Initial overnight ratings averaged around 10%, about half of the original's. Further in its run, the ratings decreased to 7-8%.

Despite the low ratings, Goong S was the most searched and rewatched drama online and ranked higher than its competition: KBS2's Dal-Ja's Spring and SBS's Surgeon Bong Dal Hee. The drama has also gained a wide variety of support from international fans in the U.S., Thailand, Malaysia, Brazil, Singapore, Philippines etc.

Ratings

Source: TNS Media Korea

International broadcast
Indonesia
Channel: Indosiar
Broadcast: September 13, 2007

Japan

Channel: MNet Japan
Broadcast: June 9, 2007
Channel: BS Japan
Broadcast: August 15, 2007

Malaysia

Channel: 8TV
Broadcast: March 26, 2008 - May 2, 2008

Philippines

Channel: Studio 23
Broadcast:2010

Singapore

Channel: Channel U
Broadcast: October 13, 2007 - December 8, 2007

Taiwan
Channel: GTV
Broadcast: July 4, 2007

Thailand

Channel: Channel 7
Broadcast: June 17, 2007 - August 12, 2007

Turkey
Channel: TRT 1
Broadcast: January 10, 2007 – March 15, 2007, January 29, 2009 - February 25, 2009

United States

Channel: LA18
Broadcast: February 21, 2007 - April 25, 2007

Vietnam

Channel: HTV7
Broadcast: August 8, 2007

Sri Lanka
Channel/Streaming service: Iflix

References

External links
 Goong S official MBC website 
 Goong S - Secret Prince official Japanese website 
 

MBC TV television dramas
2007 South Korean television series debuts
2007 South Korean television series endings
Alternate history television series
Korean-language television shows
South Korean alternate history
South Korean romantic comedy television series
South Korean teen dramas
Television spin-offs